Firebush is a common name for several plants and may refer to:

 Aronia arbutifolia
 Croton lucidus
 Embothrium coccineum (Chilean firebush)
 Euonymus alatus
 Hamelia patens
 Bassia scoparia (Mexican firebush)